Big Brain Wolf is a video game developed and released by Frima Studio through Steam in 2009. The game was created with the participation of NeuroActive Program and Telefilm Canada.

Plot

This asthmatic, vegetarian wolf is a genie in training. To prove his mother's innocence, he will have to unravel some 60 puzzles in five chapters. The number and treatment of fairy tale characters is reminiscent of movies like Shrek or Hoodwinked. It includes Pinocchio and Geppetto, Little Red Riding Hood, the Three Little Pigs, Prince Charming, and of course the Big Bad Wolf.

External links

 Official website
 
 

2009 video games
Flash cartoons
Anime-influenced Western animation
Parody video games
Puzzle video games
Single-player video games
MacOS games
Windows games
Adventure games
Frima Studio games
Shrek video games
Big Bad Wolf
Video games based on fairy tales
Works based on The Adventures of Pinocchio
Works based on Little Red Riding Hood
Works based on The Three Little Pigs
Video games about wolves
Video games about genies
Video games about children
Video games about pigs
Fictional sheep
Anthropomorphic animals
Works about princes
Video games about magic
Works about friendship
Fantasy video games set in the Middle Ages
Video games set in castles
Video games developed in Canada